FEMA is the U.S. Federal Emergency Management Agency.

FEMA may also stand for:
Federation of European Motorcyclists Associations, an association of groups and organisations representing motorcyclists throughout Europe
Fire Equipment Manufacturers' Association, an international, non-profit trade association for manufacturers of commercial fire equipment
Flavor and Extract Manufacturers Association, an organization that deals with flavors and extract processing in the United States
Foreign Exchange Management Act, 1999, India
Foreign Extraterritorial Measures Act of Canada that aims to counteract the American Helms-Burton Act
Fundação Educacional do Município de Assis, the governing body of a university in Assis, Brazil
FEMA (gene), an enzyme

See also
 Failure mode and effects analysis (FMEA)
Femur
Fima (disambiguation)